National Kaohsiung University of Science and Technology (NKUST) is a university located in Kaohsiung, Taiwan.

NKUST offers undergraduate and graduate programs in various fields such as engineering, business, management, design, humanities, and social sciences. 

NKUST has a number of research centers and institutes such as the Center for Photonics and Optoelectronic Materials, the Institute of Biomedical Engineering, and the Institute of Polymer Science and Engineering.

History
The university was formed in 2018 by a merger of the National Kaohsiung First University of Science and Technology (NKFUST), the National Kaohsiung University of Applied Sciences (KUAS) and the National Kaohsiung Marine University (NKMU).

Academic Ranking

Campus

First Campus
Located in Yanchao and Nanzih Districts. The campus was formerly the National Kaohsiung First University of Science and Technology.

Jiangong Campus
Located in Sanmin District. The campus was formerly the National Kaohsiung University of Applied Sciences.

Nanzih Campus
Located in Nanzih District. The campus was formerly the National Kaohsiung Marine University.

Cijin Campus
Located in Cijin District. The campus was formerly the National Kaohsiung Marine University.

Yanchao Campus
Located in Yanchao District.

See also
 List of universities in Taiwan

References

External links 
 

 
2018 establishments in Taiwan
Educational institutions established in 2018
Scientific organizations based in Taiwan
Technical universities and colleges in Taiwan
Universities and colleges in Kaohsiung
Universities and colleges in Taiwan